William T. Couldwell M.D., Ph.D. , a neurosurgeon,  was born in British Columbia, Canada. He is Professor and Chairman of the Department of Neurosurgery at the University of Utah, a position he assumed in 2001.

Career 
Couldwell  is currently (or has served) on the Editorial Boards of several journals (including the Journal of Neurosurgery, Chairman 2007-2008). He has served as on the Board of Directors of the American Association of Neurological Surgeons (AANS), and is a Former Director of the American Board of Neurological Surgery (ABNS).

He was President of the American Association of Neurological Surgeons (AANS) (2013-2014), and was President of the American Academy of Neurological Surgery (AAcNS; 2016-2017).

He is currently President-Elect of the World Academy of Neurological Surgery.

Publications 

He has published over 400 peer-reviewed manuscripts, 100 book chapters and seven books.

Neurosurgery Knowledge Update: A Comprehensive Review (2015)
Skull Base Surgery of the Posterior Fossa (2017)
Analysis of cerebrovascular aneurysm treatment cost: Retrospective cohort comparison of clipping, coiling, and flow diversion (2018) 
Assessment of cost drivers and cost variation for lumbar interbody fusion procedures using the value driven outcomes database (2018) 
Contemporary endovascular and open aneurysm treatment in the era of flow diversion (2018) 
Subclavian-to-extracranial vertebral artery bypass in a patient with vertebrobasilar insufficiency: 3-dimensional operative video (2018) 
Delayed Complications After Transsphenoidal Surgery for Pituitary Adenomas (2018) 
A description of familial clustering of meningiomas in the Utah population (2017) 
Clinical Outcomes with Transcranial Resection of the Tuberculum Sellae Meningioma (2017) 
Intraparenchymal hemorrhage after electroconvulsive therapy (2017) 
Overlapping Surgery: A Review of the Controversy, the Evidence, and Future Directions (2017) 
Factors influencing management of unruptured intracranial aneurysms: an analysis of 424 consecutive patients (2017) 
Navigation-guided transsylvian approach and microsurgical resection of a deep left temporal low-grade arteriovenous malformation (2017) 
Unusual presentation of aneurysmal subarachnoid haemorrhage (2017) 
Middle fossa approach for resection of vestibular schwannoma (2017) 
Management of Cavernous Sinus Involvement in Sinonasal and Ventral Skull Base Malignancies (2017) 
GoPro Hero Cameras for Creation of a Three-Dimensional, Educational, Neurointerventional Video (2017) 
Focusing on the future (2017) 
Dramatic radiographic response resulting in cerebrospinal fluid rhinorrhea associated with sunitinib therapy in recurrent atypical meningioma: case report (2017) 
IGFBP2 expression predicts IDH-mutant glioma patient survival (2016) 
Adjuvant radiotherapy for atypical meningiomas (2017)

Board Certifications 
American Board of Neurological Surgery (Neurosurg)
Royal College of Surgeons of Canada
National Board of Medical Examiners
Licentiate of the Medical Council of Canada

Family 
Couldwell and his wife, an endocrinologist, have three children.

References 

Year of birth missing (living people)
Living people
Canadian neurosurgeons
People from British Columbia
University of Utah School of Medicine faculty